The 2004 election to the post of Mayor of London took place on 10 June 2004. It was being held on the same day as other local elections and the UK part of the 2004 European Parliament elections, so Londoners had a total of five votes on three ballot papers. Polling opened at 07:00 local time, and closed at 22:00. See: 2004 UK elections. The Supplementary Vote system was used.

Ken Livingstone gained the Labour party's nomination on 2 January 2004, three weeks after being re-admitted to the Labour Party, after deputy Mayor Nicky Gavron, the previous candidate-elect, stepped down in favour of Livingstone.

Results 

Turnout: 1,920,560 (36.95% - 2.55%)
Electorate: 5,197,792
As the ballot papers are counted electronically, totals for all second preferences are available, even though most did not contribute to the final result.

Candidate selection

Labour

Conservatives

Liberal Democrats
On 5 March 2003, Simon Hughes, MP for North Southwark and Bermondsey and Frontbench Spokesman for Home Affairs was selected as the Liberal Democrats candidate over Susan Kramer, the Liberal Democrats 2000 candidate for the mayorship and the Prospective Parliamentary Candidate for Richmond Park, and environmentalist Donnachadh McCarthy.

Summary of policies
From the Manifesto booklet

Ken Livingstone - Standing up for London
 continue recovery from two decades of neglect under the Conservatives
 continue the programme of increased neighbourhood policing
 cut crime and make streets, parks and public transport safer
 continue reducing traffic congestion by extending the Congestion Charge Zone
 extend improvements in bus services and delivering similar improvements to the rest of the transport system
 improve transport in outer London with better buses and new tram lines
 run the Tube later every Friday and Saturday night with a free service on New Year's Eve
 work with government and voluntary sector with a long-term aim that all parents have access to high quality, affordable childcare.
 build 30,000 new homes a year and continue providing affordable housing
 tackle air pollution, making London a Low Emission Zone with rigorous pollution standards for lorries, buses, coaches and taxis. 
 provide free bus travel to under-18s in full-time education
 bring the Olympic Games to London in 2012

Steve Norris - For a Safer London
 cut crime, particularly street crime, vandalism and graffiti
 put more police officers on patrol rather than in cars or offices
 encourage "zero tolerance" for minor crimes like graffiti, vandalism and public drunkenness
 increase share of police officers assigned to outer London
 double funding of youth projects
 launch a New York-style ‘CompStat’ system to target and manage crime more effectively
 introduce free school buses for children at primary schools to cut congestion
 abolish the congestion charge
 run London Underground until 3am at weekends, install air conditioning and provide security guards at night

Simon Hughes - A New Mayor for a Greater London
 make London safer, easier and more liveable
 make London cleaner and greener
 continue and improve community policing
 improve public transport
 run the tube late for three nights per week
 make stations safer 
 challenge the Labour government on Council Tax, the war in Iraq and student fees
 provide a strong voice for London, putting Londoners' security and safety first

Frank Maloney - Stop the career politicians
 increase the number of police officers, decrease the amount of political correctness in policing and support victims of crime
 abolish the congestion charge, oppose speed cameras and speed humps
 create a 24-hour transport system and extend the London Underground to South East London
 put more conductors on buses and provide free bus travel for under- 18s on the way to school
 stop selling school playing fields, increasing funding for youth clubs and fund competitive sports for young people, including a London youth games
 fund mayoral scholarships for disadvantaged children to go to university
 allow business to open for 24 hours, and give assistance to businesses in deprived areas
 preserve and encourage all London's street markets
 celebrate St George's Day with an annual parade
 support the 2012 Olympic bid and other international events, marketing London internationally
 reduce the Mayor's take of Council tax
 abolish the GLA
 campaign for a higher state pension and tighter immigration controls
 provide more affordable homes for young British people and regenerate council estates

Lindsey German - Londoners deserve Respect
 fight racism and discrimination
 oppose privatisation
 ensure a minimum wage in London of £7.40 per hours and London Weighting of £4,000 per annum
 scrap council tax
 reduce cost of public transport, limit tube fare to £1.00
 campaign for social justice and pension linked to earnings
 campaign against the war in Iraq and student fees

Julian Leppert
 scrap the bid for the 2012 Olympic Games, due to expense, pressure on transport and policing, and London's track record of failing on prestige projects
 oppose further immigration, and the presence of asylum seekers in capital, as they are actually economic migrants
 reduce cost of housing and pressure for new homes by ending immigration
 increase wages in London by ending immigration
 provide two new orbital rail lines, or possibly a tram line
 abolish the congestion charge
 undertake a prestige project to build a new airport on an artificial island in the Thames Estuary with a high-speed rail link to central London, rather than extending Heathrow
 promote St George's Day

Darren Johnson - Quality Life, Quality London
 reduce traffic by expanding the congestion charge
 provide an integrated transport system that is reliable, safe and publicly owned
 reduce speed limits
 provide better cycling facilities and safe pedestrian routes for every school, 
 oppose privatisation and cutbacks
 protect parks, playing fields and open spaces and create 1,000 new allotment plots.
 work for Londoners, not big business
 work for an affordable London with action to end poverty, and end homelessness and poor housing with a new Housing for London Authority
 create jobs in green and creative industries, and in manufacturing
 work to breathe life into local economies and local shopping parades and high streets, and ensure provision of local services within walking distance
 put an end all forms of racism, sexism and homophobia
 make London safer by tackling fear, crime and its causes
 make solar panels compulsory for all new developments, expanding recycling and end incineration
 protect animal rights, wildlife and habitats
 press for an Air Traffic Congestion Charge, and an end to airport expansion and night flights

Ram Gidoomal
 deliver competence and accountability
 make London safer
 restore public confidence in the police and legal system
 ensure that new schools have a Christian or other faith-based foundation
 establish a £500 million London Regeneration Fund to bring new life and jobs to the capital. 
 tackle the divide between rich and poor
 ensure London has a coherent, integrated transport system:
 bring Christian values of justice, integrity, compassion and reconciliation to London
 celebrate diversity as a source of strength
 be independent and not waste money

Lorna Reid - We live here too!
 give a political voice to the working class in London
 make the police answerable to local communities
 actively support local communities in tackling anti-social behaviour
 increase investment in youth projects facilities for young people
 increase investment in council housing, increase number of quality affordable homes
 abolish council tax in favour of a local income tax
 ensure a minimum wage of £7.32 for workers in London
 provide a publicly financed and accountable transport system and other public services
 oppose privatisation
 secure extra provision from central government to fund increased demand on local resources from immigration
 ensure regeneration schemes provide decent homes, jobs, and opportunities for everyone.
 tackle the lack of affordable child care and the failing education system

Tammy Nagalingam
 review and make changes to all aspects of public transport and provide best value for money to all
 limit Congestion charging to between 7 am and 9.30 am, and raise revenue by other means
 ban big lorries from central London between 6 am and 6 pm
 persuade councils not to have too many one way systems and too many road ramps in smaller roads, and sort out problems with bus lane and double yellow lines
 see that the environment does not cause health hazards
 help Borough councils on public health matters, saving the NHS money and cleaning-up the city
 donate 50% of the Mayor's salary to improve public and environmental health
 provide sufficient funds for recruiting and training police officers
 provide better street lighting in alley-ways and corners of trouble spots, and get councils to provide CCTV in problem council estates and other problem areas
 celebrate St George's Day in Hyde Park
 support the 2012 Olympics bid
 liaise with other organisations

Potential candidates
London-born comedian Lee Hurst seriously considered standing as a candidate in the election. His comedy club had been under threat of redevelopment, and this had re-ignited a spark of political ambition. His manifesto would probably have included policies such as scrapping bus lanes and the congestion charge, improving public transport (including the re-introduction of bus conductors and AEC Routemaster buses), and tackling crime and abandoned cars.

References

Notes

External links
 London Elects (official elections site): full results, all manifestos, detailed explanations of voting processes
 Guardian (newspaper): collection of manifestos
 MayorWatch London Elections Guide

2004
2004 elections in the United Kingdom
Mayoral election
June 2004 events in the United Kingdom
Ken Livingstone